T'anta Raymi (Quechua t'anta bread, raymi feast, "bread feast") is a religious feast in Peru. It is celebrated annually on October 4th in Oropesa in the Cusco Region, Quispicanchi Province, Oropesa District.

References 

Cusco Region
Festivals in Peru
Quechua words and phrases